Rock My Life is the third album by German pop singer Jeanette Biedermann. It was released by Universal Records on 25 November 2002 in German-speaking Europe. In 2003, a gold edition reissue of the album was released, featuring additional songs. In 2019 the Album reach at #60 in the German Download - Charts.

Track listing

Charts

Weekly charts

Year-end charts

Certifications

References

External links
Official website

2002 albums
2003 albums
Jeanette Biedermann albums